The 1952 Soviet Chess Championship was the 20th edition of USSR Chess Championship. Held from 29 November to 29 December 1952 in Moscow. The tournament was won by Mikhail Botvinnik. Botvinnik and Mark Taimanov had a play-off match of six games in February 1953, which ended with the victory of Botvinnik 3½-2½, so bringing him his
seventh title. The final were preceded by quarter-finals events and four semifinals (at Leningrad, Minsk, Riga and Sochi). For the first time in such events players were forbidden to agree a draw in under 30 moves unless they could get the arbiter's consent.

Table and results

Play-off match

References 

USSR Chess Championships
Championship
Chess
1952 in chess
Chess